152nd meridian may refer to:

152nd  meridian east, a line of longitude east of the Greenwich Meridian
152nd meridian west, a line of longitude west of the Greenwich Meridian